Abelisauroidea is typically regarded as a Cretaceous group, though the earliest abelisauridae remains are known from the Middle Jurassic of Argentina (classified as the species Eoabelisaurus mefi) and possibly Madagascar (fragmentary remains of an unnamed species) possible abelisauridae remains (an isolated left tibia, right femur, and right tibia) were also discovered in Late Jurassic Tendaguru Beds in Tanzania.
Abelisauroids flourished in the Southern hemisphere during the Cretaceous period, but their origins can be traced back to at least the Middle Jurassic, when they had a more global distribution (the earliest known abelisauroid remains come from Australian and South American deposits dated to about 170 million years ago). By the Cretaceous period, abelisauroids had apparently become extinct in Asia and North America, possibly due to competition from tyrannosauroids. However, advanced abelisauroids of the family Abelisauridae persisted in the southern continents until the Cretaceous–Paleogene extinction event   million years ago.

Discussion 
In order to assess the phylogenetic position of Eoabelisaurus, the analysis places Eoabelisaurus as the most basal member of the Abelisauridae. Abelisaurid synapomorphies include the laterally covered lacrimal antorbital fossa, broad cervical prespinal fossae, anteroposteriorly short anterior caudal neural spines, absence of a ventral groove in the anterior caudals, presence of rudimentary centrodiapophyseal laminae in the anterior mid-caudals, reduced distal ginglymus in the manual phalanges, and the presence of a flexor depression in the pedal unguals. Alternative phylogenetic placements of Eoabelisaurus are significantly suboptimal, except for a slightly more basal position. Noasaurids had longer arms than their relatives the abelisaurids, whose arms were tiny and diminished. Although by no means as large or specialized as the arms of advanced bird-like theropods, Noasauridae arms were nevertheless capable of movement and use, possibly even for hunting in large-clawed genera such as Noasaurus. Some genera such as Limusaurus did have somewhat reduced arms and hands, but far from the extent that Abelisaurids acquired. Noasaurids were also nimble and lightly built, with feet showing adaptations for running such as a long central foot bone.

Classification 
Abelisauroidea is a superfamily which contains the family Noasauridae and Abelisauridae. Noasauridae was a very diverse group, with the two most complete members, Masiakasaurus and Limusaurus, showing unusual features very different from each other. Masiakasaurus had an unusually downturned jaw, with long and sharply pointed spoon-shaped teeth. Some of these teeth were nearly horizontal in orientation. Limusaurus, on the other hand, was completely toothless as an adult and likely possessed a horny beak. This large disparity means that it is difficult to find any skull features shared by members of Noasauridae as a whole. Abelisauridae remains are mainly known in the southern continents, which once made up the supercontinent of Gondwana. It has had several definitions in phylogenetic taxonomy. It was originally defined as a node-based taxon including Abelisaurus, Carnotaurus, and all of its descendants. Later, it was redefined as a stem-based taxon, including all animals more closely related to Abelisaurus (or the more complete Carnotaurus) than to Noasaurus.

Shared characteristics 
Complete skeletons have been described only for the most advanced abelisauridae (such as Carnotaurus and Aucasaurus), making the establishment of defining features of the skeleton for the family as a whole more difficult. However, most are known from at least some skull bones, so known shared features come mainly from the skull. Many abelisaurid skull features are shared with carcharodontosaurids. These shared features, along with the fact that abelisauridae seem to have replaced carcharodontosauridae in South America, has led to suggestions that the two groups were related.
Noasaurids were considered to be distinctive Abelisauroidea with a peculiar "sickle claw" on the second toe of the foot, convergently developed with that of Deinonychosaurians. Among Noasaurids, the Argentinean species Noasaurus leali (Later Cretaceous) and Ligabueino(Early Cretaceous) are known from incomplete specimens, including disarticulated non-ungual phalanges and in Noasaurus, a claw. A detailed overview of these elements indicates that the supposed raptorial claw of the second pedal digit actually belongs to the first or second finger of the manus, and the putative pedal non-ungual phalanges or both genera also pertain to the manus.

Discovery 
Most abelisauroid were found in Madagascar, Asia, or sometimes in Africa. Abelisauridae thrived during the Cretaceous period, on the ancient southern supercontinent of Gondwana, and today their fossil remains are found on the modern continents of Africa and South America, as well as on the Indian subcontinent and the island of Madagascar. In Madagascar, what are known as "Majungasaurus" were discovered by French paleontologist Charles Depéret. Majungasaurus was the most common abelisauroid which we know. Studies of the abelisauridae Majungasaurus indicate that it was a much slower-growing dinosaur than other theropods, taking nearly 20 years to reach adult size. Not only Majungasaurus was found in Madagascar but also Masiakasaurus which was the most complete fossil noasauridae found. Similar studies on other abelisaurid genera indicate that this slow maturation may have been a common trait to the whole of the Abelisauridae. Noasaurines are Late Cretaceous noasaurids known exclusively from southern continents and islands such as South America, Madagascar, and India which was an island near Madagascar during the Cretaceous. Elaphrosaurines were lightly built theropods, with small skulls and long necks and legs. If Limusaurus is any indication, adult elaphrosaurines were completely toothless, and their mouths were probably edged with a horny beak. It is likely that Limusaurus and other elaphrosaurines were primarily herbivorous as adults, due to mature Limusaurus specimens preserving gastroliths and chemical signatures resembling those of herbivorous dinosaurs. In South America, many abelisauroids were discovered such as Skorpiovenator, Tarasscosaurus, Erikasaurus, Quilmesaurus, Aucasarus, Ilokelesia, Pycnonemosaurus etc. In Africa, we can find many abelisauroid which were Rugops, Kryptops, etc. Many abelisauroid can grow in South America, because they can evolve in a fruitful place. Kurupi itaata represents the first formally named vertebrate of the Marília Formation (Bauru Group, Bauru Basin) and one of the few theropod records for the Maastrichtian of the Bauru Basin. Its abelisauridae affinities are well established based on the anatomy of the pelvis and anterior caudal vertebrae; however, closer relationships with other abelisauridae are still unclear. The specimens provide new information on abelisauroids which are still poorly known in the Brazilian fossil record, and on the distribution of this diverse group of theropod dinosaurs in South America. These discoveries indicate that abelisauroids were the most common large predatory dinosaurs in the outcrops where they come from.

Paleobiology

Behavior 
Using three methods, namely a cladistic analysis performed on a dentition-based data matrix, and discriminant and cluster analyses conducted on a large dataset of theropod teeth measurements, we identify three dental morphotypes which are confidently referred to abelisaurid theropods. Whether the morphotypes represent different abelisaurid subclades or different positional entities within the jaw of the same abelisaurid species, is unknown. Such an identification, nevertheless, provides additional evidence of abelisaurids feeding on sauropod carcasses.

See also

 Timeline of ceratosaur research

References

Ceratosaurs
Aalenian first appearances